Siratus pliciferoides is a species of sea snail, a marine gastropod mollusk in the family Muricidae, the murex snails or rock snails.

Description
The species attains 100+ mm. in length, depending on the siphonal canal.

Distribution

References

Muricidae
Gastropods described in 1942